The Standard Flying Fourteen is an automobile produced by the British Standard Motor Company from 1936 to 1940 and announced in October 1936. The other Flying Standard models had been announced twelve months earlier. A standard is a flag and the reference to flying standards is to flying flags as well as to the advertised abilities of the cars.

Bodies
The Standard Flying Fourteen was a four-door, five-seater saloon with a gently tapering body. From March 1937 the same specification was also made available as a 'Touring Saloon' incorporating increased luggage accommodation for touring "and the weekend golf clubs". Either body was provided on a 108-inch wheelbase with a 1,776 cc side valve four cylinder engine. A catalogued drophead coupe variant was also available and in addition special coachwork by Avon was available as usual on all Standard models.

The wide (53 inches) rear seating was given extra knee-room by recesses in the backs of the front seats. Luxury rear standard fittings included folding tables. Draught free ventilation came from swivelling quarter-lights. There were independent bucket seats in front with a settee type available if requested. Both seating and pedals were adjustable. The driver's steering column was telescopic. A flush-fitting sliding roof was provided. The Lucas mellotone wind-horns adjusted for town or country. The luxurious upholstery was unpleated.

The conventional shield-shaped radiator casing was replaced by a chromed vertically-barred "waterfall" grille in July 1937, earlier on some other Flying Standard models.

Chassis
The engine was part of a single assembly including its clutch and gearbox. This assembly was held at three points in "live rubber" with a steadying bearing forward of the flywheel. Suspension was by long semi-elliptic springs at each corner of the car controlled by Luvax shock absorbers combined with a front (anti-roll) torsion bar. The chassis was mounted on large section tyres. Spare wheel and tyre were stowed in a separate compartment below the luggage locker. Permanent hydraulic jacks were built into the chassis. Both springs and frame pass beneath the back axle.

Road test
When on test The Times reported that, while the engine was not as smooth as a six-cylinder, the car felt sturdy and the controls proved easy to operate. The windscreen would open out far enough to provide the driver with a direct view.

Jaguar
The Fourteen's engine and transmission were used by the Jaguar 1½ Litre retrospectively known as the Jaguar Mk IV.

Standard Ensign 1957
A new model introduced at the October 1957 Motor Show, Standard Ensign, in this case with slightly reduced equipment levels from Standard's Vanguard, was given a 1670 cc engine and a four-speed gearbox with a then-popular sporting retro sturdy floor-mounted gear lever. The engine was less powerful than the Vanguard's but the car was considerably lighter and The Times regarded it as an unusually attractive car to drive recalling prewar Standard Flying Fourteens.

References

External links
Standard Motor Club

Flying Fourteen
Cars introduced in 1936
Rear-wheel-drive vehicles
Sedans
Coupés